1872 Hamada earthquake was an earthquake that occurred on March 14, 1872 off the coast of Hamada, Shimane Prefecture in Japan.  This quake occurred at 16:40 local time.

Overview 

 Date : 
 Magnitude : 7.1 MK
 Epicenter : off coast Hamada, Shimane Prefecture
 Death toll : 551 (official confirmed)

Damage 
According to the official confirmed report, 4506 houses were damaged by the earthquake, 230 houses were burned, 551 people were killed, and landslides destroyed 6567 homes in the affected area.

References 

1872 in Japan
1872 earthquakes
March 1872 events
Earthquakes of the Meiji period
History of Shimane Prefecture
1872 disasters in Japan